Home cinema, also called home theaters or theater rooms, are home entertainment audio-visual systems that seek to reproduce a movie theater experience and mood using consumer electronics-grade video and audio equipment that is set up in a room or backyard of a private home. Some studies show films are rated better and generate more intense emotions when watched in a movie theater, however, convenience is a major appeal for home cinemas. In the 1980s, home cinemas typically consisted of a movie pre-recorded on a LaserDisc or VHS tape; a LaserDisc Player or VCR; and a heavy, bulky large-screen cathode ray tube TV set, although sometimes CRT projectors were used instead. In the 2000s, technological innovations in sound systems, video player equipment and TV screens and video projectors have changed the equipment used in home cinema set-ups and enabled home users to experience a higher-resolution screen image, improved sound quality and components that offer users more options (e.g., many of the more expensive Blu-ray players in 2016 can also stream movies and TV shows over the Internet using subscription services such as Netflix). The development of Internet-based subscription services means that 2016-era home theatre users do not have to commute to a video rental store as was common in the 1980s and 1990s (nevertheless, some movie enthusiasts buy DVD or Blu-ray discs of their favorite content)

In the 2020s, a home cinema system typically uses a large projected image from a video projector or a large flat-screen high-resolution HDTV system, a movie or other video content on a DVD or high-resolution Blu-ray disc, which is played on a DVD player or Blu-ray player, with the audio augmented with a multi-channel power amplifier and anywhere from two speakers and a stereo power amp (for stereo sound) to a 5.1 channel amplifier and five or more surround sound speaker cabinets (with a surround sound system). Whether home cinema enthusiasts have a stereo set-up or a 5.1 channel surround system, they typically use at least one low-frequency subwoofer speaker cabinet to amplify low-frequency effects from movie soundtracks and reproduce the deep pitches from the musical soundtrack.

Introduction
The first home theatres were made with 16 mm projectors in the 1920s. Technological improvements led to 8 mm and sound 1 6mm in the 1930s. In the 1950s, playing home movies became popular in the United States with middle class and upper-class families as Kodak 8 mm film projector equipment became more affordable. The development of multi-channel audio systems and later LaserDisc in the 1980s created a new paradigm for home video, as it enabled movie enthusiasts to add better sound and images to their setup. In the mid-1980s to the mid-1990s, a typical home cinema in the United States would have a LaserDisc or VHS player playing a movie, with the signal fed to a large rear-projection television set, with the audio output through a stereo system. Some people used expensive front projectors in a darkened viewing room. During the 1980s, watching movies on VHS at home became a popular leisure activity. Beginning in the late 1990s, and continuing throughout much of the 2000s, home-theater technology progressed with the development of the DVD-Video format (higher resolution than VHS), Dolby Digital 5.1-channel audio (surround sound) speaker systems, and high-definition television (HDTV), which initially included bulky, heavy Cathode Ray Tube HDTVs and flat-screen TVs.  In the 2010s, affordable large HDTV flatscreen TVs, high resolution video projectors (e.g., DLP), 3D television technology and the high resolution Blu-ray Disc (1080p) have ushered in a new era of home theater.

Recent developments
In the 2010s, the term home cinema encompasses a range of systems meant for movie playback at home. The most basic and economical system could be a DVD player, a standard-definition (SD) large-screen television with at least a 27-inch (69 cm) diagonal screen size, and an inexpensive home theater in a box surround sound amplifier and speaker system with a subwoofer. A more expensive home cinema set-up might include a Blu-ray disc player, home theater PC (HTPC) computer or digital media receiver streaming devices with a 10-foot user interface, a high-definition video projector and projection screen with over  diagonal screen size (or a large flatscreen HDTV), and a several-hundred-watt home theater receiver with five to eleven surround-sound speakers plus one or two powerful subwoofers. 3D-TV-enabled home theaters make use of 3D TV sets/projectors and Blu-ray 3D players in which the viewers wear 3D-glasses, enabling them to see 3D content.

Home cinema designs and layouts are a personal choice and the type of home cinema a user can set up depends on her/his budget and the space which is available within the home. The minimum set of requirements for a home theater are: a large television set or good quality video projector CRT (no new models sold in U.S.), LCD, Digital Light Processing (DLP), plasma display, organic light-emitting diode (OLED), Silicon X-tal Reflective Display (SXRD), Laser TV, rear-projection TV, video projector, Standard-definition television (SDTV), HDTV, or 3D-TV at least 27 inches (69 cm) measured diagonally, an AV receiver or pre-amplifier (surround processor) and amplifier combination capable of at least stereo sound but preferably 5.1 Channel Dolby Digital and DTS audio, and something that plays or broadcasts movies in at least stereo sound such as a VHS HI-FI VCR, LaserDisc player (no new stand-alone models of either are available; VHS VCRs are usually bundled in combo decks with DVD players), a DVD player, a Blu-ray disc player, cable or satellite receiver, video game console, etc. Finally, a set of speakers, at least two, are needed but more common are anywhere from six to eight with a subwoofer for bass or low-frequency effects.

The most expensive home cinema set-ups, which can cost over $100,000 US, and which are in the homes of executives, celebrities and high-earning professionals, have expensive, large, high-resolution digital projectors and projection screens, and maybe even custom-built screening rooms which include cinema-style chairs and audiophile-grade sound equipment designed to mimic (or sometimes even exceed) commercial cinema performance.

Design

In the 2010s, many home cinema enthusiasts aim to replicate, to the degree that is possible, the cinema experience. To do so, many home cinema buffs purchase higher quality components than used for everyday television viewing on a relatively small TV with only built-in speakers. A typical home cinema includes the following components:
Movie or other viewing content: As the name implies, one of the key reasons for setting up a home cinema is to watch movies on a large screen, which does a more effective job at reproducing filmed images of vast landscapes or epic battle sequences. As of 2016, home cinema enthusiasts using smart Blu-ray players may also watch DVDs of TV shows, and recorded or live sports events or music concerts. As well, with a smart player, a user may be able to stream movies, TV shows and other content over the Internet. Many 2016-era DVD players and Blu-ray players also have inputs that allow users to view digital photos and other content on the big screen.
Video and audio input devices: One or more video/audio sources. High-resolution movie media formats such as Blu-ray discs are normally preferred, though DVD or video game console systems are also used. Some home theaters include a HTPC (Home Theater PC) with a media center software application to act as the main library for video and music content using a 10-foot user interface and remote control. In 2016, some of the more expensive Blu-ray players can stream movies and TV shows over the Internet.
Audio and video processing devices: Input signals are processed by either a standalone AV receiver or a preamplifier and Sound Processor for complex surround sound formats such as Dolby Pro-Logic/and or Pro-logic II, X, and Z, Dolby Digital, DTS, Dolby Digital EX, DTS-ES, Dolby Digital Plus, Dolby TrueHD, DTS-HD Master Audio, Dolby Atmos and DTS X. The user selects the input (e.g., DVD, Blu-ray player, streaming video, etc.) at this point before it is forwarded to the output stage. Some AV receivers enable the viewer to use a remote control to select which input device or source to use.
Audio output: Systems consist of preamplifiers, power amplifiers (both of which may be integrated into a single AV receiver) and two or more loudspeakers mounted in speaker enclosures. The audio system requires at least a stereo power amplifier and two speakers, for stereo sound; most systems have multi-channel surround sound power amplifier and six or more speakers (a 5.1 surround sound system has left and right front speakers, a centre speaker, left and right rear speakers and a low-frequency subwoofer speaker enclosure). Some users have 7.1 Surround Sound. It is possible to have up to 11 speakers with additional subwoofers.
Video output: A large-screen display, typically an HDTV. Some users may have a 3D TV.  As of 2015, flatscreen HDTVs are the norm. Options include Liquid crystal display television (LCD), plasma TV, and OLED. Home cinema users may also use a video projector and a movie screen. If a projector is used, a portable, temporary screen may be used,a screen may be permanently mounted or the image may be projected directly on a wall.
Seating and atmosphere: Comfortable seating is often provided to improve the cinema feel. Some luxury home cinemas have movie theatre-style padded chairs for guests. Higher-end home theaters commonly also have sound insulation to prevent noise from escaping the room and specialized wall treatment to balance the sound within the room. Wall color can be optimized.

Component systems vs. theater-in-a-box

Home cinemas can either be set up by purchasing individual components one by one (e.g., buying a multichannel amp from one manufacturer, a Blu-ray player from another manufacturer, speakers from another company, etc.) or a by purchasing a HTIB (Home Theater in a Box) package which includes all components from a single manufacturer, with the exception of a TV or projector. HTIB systems typically include a DVD or Blu-ray player, a surround sound amplifier, five surround speakers, a subwoofer cabinet, cables and a remote. The benefit of purchasing separate components one by one is that consumers can attain improved quality in video or audio and better matching between the components and the needs of a specific room, or the consumer's needs.

However, to buy individual components, a consumer must have knowledge of sound system and video system design and electronics and they must do research on the specifications of each component.  For instance, some speakers perform better in smaller rooms while others perform better in larger rooms and seating location must be considered. One of the challenges with buying all the components separately is that the purchaser must understand speaker impedance, power handling, and HDMI compatibility and cabling. Given these challenges, HTIB systems are a simpler and more cost-effective solution for many families and consumers; they are also better suited to smaller living spaces in semi-detached homes or apartments/condos where noise could be an issue. Buying an HTIB package is often less expensive than buying separate components.

Dedicated rooms

Some home cinema enthusiasts build a dedicated room in their home for the theater. These more advanced installations often include sophisticated acoustic design elements, including room-in-a-room construction that isolates sound and provides an improved listening environment and a large screen, often using a high-definition projector. These installations are often designated as screening rooms to differentiate them from simpler, less-expensive installations. In some movie enthusiast's home cinemas, this idea can go as far as completely recreating an actual small-scale cinema, with a projector enclosed in its own projection booth, specialized furniture, curtains in front of the projection screen, movie posters, or a popcorn or vending machine with snack food and candy. More commonly, real dedicated home theaters pursue this to a lesser degree.

As of 2016, the days of the $100,000 and over home cinema system are being usurped by the rapid advances in digital audio and video technologies, which has spurred a rapid drop in prices, making a home cinema set-up more affordable than ever before. This in turn has brought the true digital home theater experience to the doorsteps of the do-it-yourselfers, often for much less than the price of a low-budget economy car. As of 2016, consumer-grade A/V equipment can meet some of the standards of a small modern commercial cinema (e.g., THX sound).

Seating
Home cinema seating consists of chairs or sofas specifically engineered and designed for viewing movies in a home cinema. Some home cinema seats have a cup holder built into the chairs' armrests and a shared armrest between each seat. Some seating has cinema-style chairs like those seen in a cinema, which feature a flip-up seat cushion. Other seating systems have plush leather reclining lounger types, with flip-out footrests. Available features include storage compartments, snack trays, tactile transducers for low-frequency effects that can be felt through a chair (without creating high volume levels which could disturb other family members), and electric motors to adjust the chair. Home cinema seating tends to be more comfortable than seats in a public cinema.

Backyard cinema
In homes that have an adequately sized backyard, it is possible for people to set up a home cinema in an outdoor area. Depending on the space available, it may simply be a temporary version with foldable screen, a video projector and a couple of speakers, or a permanent fixture with a huge screen and dedicated audio set-up mounted in a weather-proof cabinet. Outdoor home cinemas are popular with BBQ parties and pool parties. Some specialist outdoor home-cinema companies are now marketing packages with inflatable movie screens and purpose-built AV systems. Some people have expanded the idea and constructed mobile drive-in theaters that can play movies in public open spaces. Usually, these require a powerful projector, a laptop or DVD player, outdoor speakers or an FM transmitter to broadcast the audio to other car radios.

History

1920s–1940s
In the 1920s the first home cinemas were made using silent 16mm film projectors such as Kodascope and Filmo. Later, in the 1930s, 8mm and sound 16mm were introduced. These were rare luxuries.

1950s–1970s
In the 1950s, home movies became more popular in the United States and elsewhere as Kodak 8 mm film (Pathé 9.5 mm in France) and camera and projector equipment became affordable. Projected with a small, portable movie projector onto a portable screen, often without sound, this system became the first practical home theater. They were generally used to show home movies of family travels and celebrations, but they also doubled as a means of showing some commercial films, or private stag films. Dedicated home cinemas were called screening rooms at the time and were outfitted with 16 mm or even 35 mm projectors for showing commercial films. These were found almost exclusively in the homes of the very wealthy, especially those in the movie industry.

Portable home cinemas improved over time with colour film, Kodak Super 8 mm film cartridges, and monaural sound but remained awkward and somewhat expensive. The rise of home video in the late 1970s almost completely killed the consumer market for 8 mm film cameras and projectors, as VCRs connected to ordinary televisions provided a simpler and more flexible substitute.

1980s
The development of multi-channel audio systems and LaserDisc in the 1980s added new dimensions for home cinema. The first-known home cinema system was designed, built and installed by Steve J. LaFontaine as a sales tool at Kirshmans furniture store in Metairie, Louisiana in 1974. He built a special sound room that incorporated the earliest quadraphonic audio systems, and he modified Sony Trinitron televisions for projecting the image. Many systems were sold in the New Orleans area in the ensuing years before the first public demonstration of this integration occurred in 1982 at the Summer Consumer Electronics Show in Chicago, Illinois. Peter Tribeman of NAD (U.S.) organized and presented a demonstration made possible by the collaborative effort of NAD, Proton, ADS, Lucasfilm and Dolby Labs, who contributed their technologies to demonstrate what a home cinema would look and sound like.

Over the course of three days, retailers, manufacturers, and members of the consumer electronics press were exposed to the first home-like experience of combining a high-quality video source with multi-channel surround sound. That one demonstration is credited with being the impetus for developing what is now a multibillion-dollar business.

1990s
In the early to mid-1990s, a typical home cinema would have a LaserDisc player or VHS VCR fed to a large screen: rear projection for the more-affordable setups, and LCD or CRT front-projection in the more-elaborate systems. In the late 1990s, a new wave of home-cinema interest was sparked by the development of DVD-Video, Dolby Digital and DTS 5.1-channel audio, and high-quality front video projectors that provide a cinema experience at a price that rivals a big-screen HDTV.

2000s

In the 2000s, developments such as high-definition video, Blu-ray disc (as well as the now-obsolete HD DVD format, which lost the format war to Blu-ray) and newer high-definition 3D display technologies enabled people to enjoy a cinematic feeling in their own home at a more-affordable price.  Newer lossless audio from Dolby Digital Plus, Dolby TrueHD, DTS-HD High-Resolution Audio and DTS-HD Master Audio and speaker systems with more audio channels (such as 6.1, 7.1, 9.1, 9.2, 10.2, and 22.2) were also introduced for a more cinematic feeling.

2010s

By the mid-2010s, the Blu-ray Disc medium had become a common home media standard, and online video streaming sources such as Netflix, Hulu and YouTube were offering a range of high-definition content, including some 4K content (although various compression technologies are applied to make this streamed content feasible). The first 4K Blu-ray discs were released in 2016. By this point, 4K TVs and computer monitors were rapidly declining in price and increasing in prevalence, despite a lack of native 4K content. While many DSP systems existed, DTS-HD Master Audio remained the studio standard for lossless surround sound encoding on Blu-ray, with five or seven native discrete channels. High-definition video projectors also continued to improve and decrease in price, relative to performance.

As a result of continuing price reductions, large (up to 80'') TVs became a financially competitive alternative to video projectors in living room or even smaller dedicated room setups. Technologies such as local dimming and the like improved the black levels of LCD screens making them more suitable for use in a dark room. Consumer-grade OLED TVs measuring 55'' and above began to emerge in the second half of the decade. These had even better black levels. However, as of 2020, video projectors remained the only viable option when screen sizes much over 80'' are needed.

Entertainment equipment standards
Noise Criteria (NC) are noise-level guidelines applicable to cinema and home cinema. For this application, it is a measure of a room's ambient noise level at various frequencies. For example, in order for a theater to be THX certified, it must have an ambient sound level of NC-30 or less. This helps to retain the dynamic range of the system. Some NC levels are:

NC 40: Significant but not a dooming level of ambient noise; the highest acceptable ambient noise level. 40 decibels is the lower sound pressure level of normal talking; 60 being the highest.
NC 30: A good NC level; necessary for THX certification in cinemas.
NC 20: An excellent NC level; difficult to attain in large rooms and sought after for dedicated home cinema systems. For example, for a home cinema to be THX certified, it has to have a rating of NC 22.
NC 10: Virtually impossible noise criteria to attain; 10 decibels is associated with the sound level of calm breathing.

Projectors used for home cinemas have a set of recommended criteria:

Brightness, usually at least 1800 lumens.
Resolution (the number of pixels making up the image), usually at least 1920×1080, one of the HDTV standards.
Contrast (how well white, black and greyscales are displayed), usually a minimum of 5000:1.
HDMI connection sockets (although some people use older component video, connections with three-cord sockets for the different individual colours)
Good quality manufacturers, although this is a subjective element that depends upon user tastes and budget. For one user with a modest budget, good quality may mean a mainstream consumer electronics brand; for a well-to-do user, a Christie projector may be their interpretation of good quality (Christie units are widely used in professional, commercial theatres)

See also
Digital cinema
Home theater PC
Media server
Over-the-top media service

References

External links

 The Evolution of Home Theater – Big Tech of the Small Screen 

Cinemas and movie theaters
Cinema
High-definition television
Ultra-high-definition television